Catostylus tagi is a species of jellyfish from warmer parts of the East Atlantic Ocean and since the 2000s also found in the Mediterranean Sea. It is the only member of the family Catostylidae that is found in Europe. It has collagen in its bell which is currently being researched to see if it has biomedical uses as an intercellular matrix. The species is named after the Tagus river.

Description
Typical Catostylus with chunky appendages and tentacle to go with each. This jellyfish has a sting that causes light pain and a skin rash, but generally poses no serious threat. Its colour is variable and can be blue-white, cream, brown, or off-white. The exumbrellar grooves are reddish or purplish brown. C. tagi has gonads along the edge of its stomach in an X shape. It has the octant formation typical of Catostylus jellies, the height of the octants are also variable.

Food
Eats both zooplankton and phytoplankton, certain crustaceans, small fish, and marine snow.

Biomedical use
Its bell collagen is currently being researched for use as an intercellular matrix. The collagen is made up of 1/3 glycine and the most of the rest is water and other amino acids, its amino acid content is very small. The collagen is denatured as soon as it reaches .

References 

Boltovsky, T., Bernardo Abiahy, Viviana A. Alder, Martin V. Angel, Renate Bernstein, Dennis Binet, Demetrio Boltovsky, Jean Bouillon, Janet Bradford-Grieve, John-Paul Casanova, Paul Cornelius, Jose R. Dadon, Christina Deponte, Graciela B. Esnal, Maria Alamo, Adilson Fransozo, Mark Gibbons, Ray Gibson, and Cristoph Helemben. "Marine Species Identification Portal : Catostylus tagi." Marine Species Identification Portal : Catostylus tagi. UNESCO, n.d. Web. 24 Sept. 2014.

External links 

Catostylus
Animals described in 1869
Taxa named by Ernst Haeckel